The Nanosat-1B Spanish satellite, designed, developed and operated by the Instituto Nacional de Técnica Aeroespacial (INTA) (National Institute of Aerospace Technology), is a nanosatellite which weighs 22 kg. Its main mission is the communication between remote sites like the Antarctic, the Hespérides warship and Spain. The Nanosat-1B has fourteen sides, all of them covered by solar cells but the bottom one where the following antennas are installed: a medium gain Ultra high frequency (UHF) four wire antenna and two patch antennas. On the top side there are four UHF monopoles. The solar sensors and the Vectorsol experiment are located in the middle tray, being all the other equipment and experiments located inside the satellite.

The Nanosat-1B covers all the Earth due to his polar orbit and it stores scientific data which are unloaded when the satellite passes the Control Centre vertical (located at INTA, Torrejón, Madrid) and the mobile stations (Nano-Terminals).

This satellite was launched on 29 July 2009 at 18:46 UTC from the Baikonur Cosmodrome in Kazakhstan, launchpad 95, by a Dnepr launch vehicle along with the other five satellites: DubaiSat-1 (this one being the main load), Deimos-1, UK-DMC 2, Aprizesat-3 and Aprizesat-4.

Nanosat-1B payload 
Three Experiments:
 The Two Towers (LDT): this is a high energy proton detector, which will help to characterize the special environment within a certain radiation range. 
 RAD-FET: this is composed of two sensors, one for accumulated radiation doses and a magneto-impedance sensor. Both LDT and RAD-FET have been entirely developed at INTA.
 Vectorsol: this is a last generation solar sensor which allows to position the satellite. It has been developed by the Universidad de Sevilla along with the Universitat Politècnica de Catalunya and it has been submitted to flight qualification testing at INTA.

Two Communication Systems:
 S Band Transmitter-Receiver: to be tested in orbit, it has been especially designed to be on board of the new nanosatellites and microsatellites. It offers a very good performance at a very low cost. It is based on the latest FPGA technologies. It has been designed by AD Telecom, but developed and qualified at INTA.
 Medium gain UHF antenna: this four wire antenna along with the four monopoles developed by INTA will allow communications with mobile stations (Nano-Terminals) to be performed.

Future approach 
Besides their weight and size characteristics, the nanosatellites are a new concept of design for space system and a great opportunity to reach space at lower development cost and time. The Nanosat Program foresees several new launches with precise applications, as these platforms are particularly suitable for in orbit demonstration missions including instruments, components and supporting technologies for bigger Space Programs.

See also 

 Nanosat 01
 Communications satellite

References

External links 

 INTA Official Site 
 Nanosat en Orbita Official document of INTA 
 Programa Nanosat Official document of INTA 
 Nanosat 01 Gunter's Space Page. 
 NASA Details of the designation, NASA.
 Real time satellite tracking Tracking real-time satellite.
 MPDI Small magnetic sensor for space applications 
 MPDI Small Fluxgate Magnetometers: Development and Future Trends in Spain

Spacecraft launched in 2009
Satellites of Spain
Communications satellites in low Earth orbit
Spacecraft launched by Dnepr rockets
INTA satellites